This is a list of Major League Baseball players who played in Australia professionally.

Players
Key

See also
List of Major League Baseball players from Australia
Major League Baseball Australia Academy Program

References
Source: Australian Major League – US Imports, Flintoff and Dunn. Retrieved 2009-08-28

Australia
Major League Baseball players who played in Australia